This is a round-up of the 2008 Sligo Intermediate Football Championship. St. Molaise Gaels were crowned champions for the fourth time, the first under the new name, after a replayed final victory over 2005 champions Coolaney/Mullinabreena.

Group stages

The Championship was contested by 13 teams, divided into four groups. The top two sides in each group advanced to the quarter-finals, with the remaining sides in each group facing the Relegation playoffs to retain Intermediate status for 2009, as the restructuring of the Championships got under way.

Group A

Group B

Group C

Group D

Quarterfinals

Semifinals

Last eight

Sligo Intermediate Football Championship Final

Sligo Intermediate Football Championship Final Replay

Relegation

References

 Sligo Champion (Summer/Autumn 2008)
 Sligo Weekender (Summer/Autumn 2008)

Sligo Intermediate Football Championship
Sligo Intermediate Football Championship